Kolbrún Halldórsdóttir (born 31 July 1955) is an Icelandic politician with the Left-Green Movement. She was a member of the Althing (Iceland's parliament) for Reykjavík constituencies from 1999. She didn't get re-elected in 2009. She was Minister for the Environment and Minister for Nordic Cooperation, in 2009. She is President of ECA – European Council of Artists (2011).

Supporting prisoner artists 
Kolbrún Halldórsdóttir, as the president of ECA, joint to Biggest International campaign Freemuse for Iranian musician Mehdi Rajabian and his brother, film-maker Hossein Rajabian; he was signed by the following of the ARJ group.

References

External links 
Personal blog

1955 births
Living people
Kolbrun Halldorsdottir
Kolbrun Halldorsdottir
Kolbrun Halldorsdottir
Kolbrun Halldorsdottir
Kolbrun Halldorsdottir